Anne Greenup was the first president of The Coloured Women's Club of Montreal. A Canadian solidarity prize is named for her.

References

Black Canadian women
19th-century Canadian women
20th-century Canadian women
Year of birth missing
Year of death missing

Date of death unknown
Date of birth unknown